Itissaalik Island (old spelling: Itivsâlik) is a small, uninhabited island located in Avannaata municipality in northwestern Greenland.

History 
Itissaalik Island was inhabited, although not continuously. Between 1904 and 1909, a small settlement of the same name (also spelled Itussaalik) was established on the island. It was repopulated again in 1911, and finally abandoned in 1957, during the post-war consolidation phase in northwestern Greenland.

Geography 
Itissaalik Island is located in the northern part of Upernavik Archipelago, in the northern part of Sugar Loaf Bay, an indentation of Baffin Bay. The island is part of a chain of small islands off the southern coast of Nuussuaq Peninsula. Other islands in the chain include Sugar Loaf Island, Timilersua Island, and Saarlia to the southwest of Itissaalik − and Paornarqortuut and Inussulikassak to the northeast.

References 

Uninhabited islands of Greenland
Sugar Loaf Bay
Islands of the Upernavik Archipelago